The Aq Jol Democratic Party, commonly referred to simply as Aq Jol, is a liberal-conservative political party in Kazakhstan. 

The party is loyal to President Kassym-Jomart Tokayev and his part of the pro-Tokayev People's Coalition.

History 
The Ak Zhol was founded in 2002 when a group of moderates split from the more radical Democratic Choice of Kazakhstan movement, founded in November 2001 by anti-Nazarbayev activists. The new more moderate party ran on a pro-reform, pro-business platform, and in contrast to the Democratic Choice of Kazakhstan movement, its leaders refrained from openly confronting Nūrsūltan Nazarbayev. Aq Jol was founded by Oraz Jandosov, Bulat Äbılov and Alihan Baimenov. Former Information Minister Altynbek Särsenbaiūly later joined the party in 2003.

Aq Jol nominated Dania Espaeva as its candidate for the 2019 presidential election. It was the first time ever a woman ran for President in the country. Espaeva received 5.05 percent (465,714) of votes. Her participation in the election received praise from the OSCE Parliamentary Assembly election observation mission as a good start for a higher women's representation in politics.

In October 2022, the QHP joined the People's Coalition, in support of President Kassym-Jomart Tokayev, ceasing to be even nominally part of the opposition.

Electoral performance 
Aq Jol received 12% of the votes at the 2004 legislative elections. Alihan Baimenov refused to accept the only seat the party received at the 77 member Mäjılıs until October 2006 when he reversed his position and joined parliament as the only deputy of an opposition party. The party advocated democratization of the political system, particularly elections of governors (akims) at all levels of the administrative system.

Fragmentation 
In the spring of 2005, Särsenbaiūly, Äbılov and Jandosov split from the party to form a dissident faction named Nağyz Ak Jol (True Bright Path). At the last presidential elections on 4 December 2005 Aq Jol did not join the opposition political alliance For A Just Kazakhstan and instead nominated Alihan Baimenov, the chair, as the party candidate. Baimenov won 1.61% of the popular vote. One of the party leaders who later joined the Nağyz Ak Jol party, Altynbek Särsenbaiūly, was killed near Almaty in February 2006 soon after the presidential elections.
In the 18 August 2007 Mäjılıs elections, the party won 3.27% of the popular vote and no seats. All seats were won by the ruling Nur-Otan party. In the 2012 Mäjılıs election, the party won 8 seats and thus becoming one of three parties represented in the legislature. The party won 7 seats in the 2016 Mäjılıs elections.

Electoral history

Presidential elections

Mäjılıs elections

See also 
:Category:Ak Zhol Democratic Party politicians

References

External links 
 

Political parties in Kazakhstan
Political parties established in 2002
Centre-right parties in Asia
Liberal conservative parties